David Andrade may refer to:

 David Andrade (anarchist) (1859–1928), Australian anarchist and individualist
 David Andrade (footballer) (born 1993), Mexican footballer